Ornipholidotos jax is a butterfly in the family Lycaenidae. It is found in the Central African Republic. The habitat consists of forests.

References

Butterflies described in 1998
Ornipholidotos
Endemic fauna of the Central African Republic
Butterflies of Africa